Kyla is the second self-titled studio album by Filipino R&B singer Kyla, released by Poly East Records under EMI Philippines in 2002.

The album carrier single is I Feel For You written by Edwin Marollano and produced by Francis Guevarra, Jr.

Track listing

1 the original version is from Way To Your Heart album

Album Credits
Personnel
Jose Vicente Colayco – executive producer
Chuck Isidro – supervising producer
Francis Guevarra, Jr. – producer
Jo Tomas – digital graphics, lay-out design
Jay Javier – photography
Heidi – hair, make-up (Bambi Fuentes Salon)
Production
Melanie Calumpad (Kyla) – vocals, background vocals
Arnie Mendaros – background vocals, vocal arrangement
Bogie Manipon – vocal dubbing (Cloud 9 Recording Studio)
Gerry Samson – vocal dubbing (Jam Creations)
Ferdie Marquez – arranger, mixing, mastering (FLIPTECH Recording Studio)
Francis Guevarra, Jr. – arranger
Yong Nalasa – arranger
Jun Tamayo – arranger
Lee Andre Katindoy – arranger, mixing

See also
 Kyla discography

References

2002 albums
Kyla albums